Oblate spheroidal coordinates are a three-dimensional orthogonal coordinate system that results from rotating the two-dimensional elliptic coordinate system about the non-focal axis of the ellipse, i.e., the symmetry axis that separates the foci. Thus, the two foci are transformed into a ring of radius  in the x-y plane.  (Rotation about the other axis produces prolate spheroidal coordinates.)  Oblate spheroidal coordinates can also be considered as a limiting case of ellipsoidal coordinates in which the two largest semi-axes are equal in length.

Oblate spheroidal coordinates are often useful in solving partial differential equations when the boundary conditions are defined on an oblate spheroid or a hyperboloid of revolution.  For example, they played an important role in the calculation of the Perrin friction factors, which contributed to the awarding of the 1926 Nobel Prize in Physics to Jean Baptiste Perrin.  These friction factors determine the rotational diffusion of molecules, which affects the feasibility of many techniques such as protein NMR and from which the hydrodynamic volume and shape of molecules can be inferred.  Oblate spheroidal coordinates are also useful in problems of electromagnetism (e.g., dielectric constant of charged oblate molecules), acoustics (e.g., scattering of sound through a circular hole), fluid dynamics  (e.g., the flow of water through a firehose nozzle) and the diffusion of materials and heat (e.g., cooling of a red-hot coin in a water bath)

Definition (µ,ν,φ)

The most common definition of oblate spheroidal coordinates  is

where  is a nonnegative real number and the angle . These coordinates are favored over the alternatives below because they are not degenerate; the set of coordinates  describes a unique point in Cartesian coordinates . The reverse is also true, except on the -axis and the disk in the -plane inside the focal ring.

Coordinate surfaces

The surfaces of constant μ form oblate spheroids, by the trigonometric identity

since they are ellipses rotated about the z-axis, which separates their foci.  An ellipse in the x-z plane (Figure 2) has a major semiaxis of length a cosh μ along the x-axis, whereas its minor semiaxis has length a sinh μ along the z-axis.  The foci of all the ellipses in the x-z plane are located on the x-axis at ±a.

Similarly, the surfaces of constant ν form one-sheet half hyperboloids of revolution by the hyperbolic trigonometric identity

For positive , the half-hyperboloid is above the x-y plane (i.e., has positive z) whereas for negative ν, the half-hyperboloid is below the x-y plane (i.e., has negative z).  Geometrically, the angle ν corresponds to the angle of the asymptotes of the hyperbola.  The foci of all the hyperbolae are likewise located on the x-axis at ±a.

Inverse transformation

The (μ, ν, φ) coordinates may be calculated from the Cartesian coordinates (x, y, z) as follows.  The azimuthal angle φ is given by the formula

The cylindrical radius ρ of the point P is given by

and its distances to the foci in the plane defined by φ is given by

The remaining coordinates μ and ν can be calculated from the equations

where the sign of μ is always non-negative, and the sign of ν is the same as that of z.

Another method to compute the inverse transform is

where

Scale factors

whereas the azimuthal scale factor equals

Consequently, an infinitesimal volume element equals

and the Laplacian can be written

Basis Vectors

The orthonormal basis vectors for the  coordinate system can be expressed in Cartesian coordinates as

where  are the Cartesian unit vectors. Here,  is the outward normal vector to the oblate spheroidal surface of constant ,  is the same azimuthal unit vector from spherical coordinates, and  lies in the tangent plane to the oblate spheroid surface and completes the right-handed basis set.

Definition (ζ, ξ, φ)

The curves of constant  are oblate spheroids and the curves of constant  are the hyperboloids of revolution.

The relationship to Cartesian coordinates is

Scale factors

Knowing the scale factors, various functions of the coordinates can be calculated by the general method outlined in the orthogonal coordinates article. The infinitesimal volume element is:

The gradient is:

The divergence is:

and the Laplacian equals

Oblate spheroidal harmonics 

As is the case with spherical coordinates and spherical harmonics, Laplace's equation may be solved by the method of separation of variables to yield solutions in the form of oblate spheroidal harmonics, which are convenient to use when boundary conditions are defined on a surface with a constant oblate spheroidal coordinate.

Following the technique of separation of variables, a solution to Laplace's equation is written:

This yields three separate differential equations in each of the variables:

where  is a constant which is an integer because the φ variable is periodic with period 2π. n will then be an integer. The solution to these equations are:

The product of the three solutions is called an oblate spheroidal harmonic and the general solution to Laplace's equation is written:

The constants will combine to yield only four independent constants for each harmonic.

Definition (σ, τ, φ)

An alternative and geometrically intuitive set of oblate spheroidal coordinates (σ, τ, φ) are sometimes used, where σ = cosh μ and τ = cos ν.  Therefore, the coordinate σ must be greater than or equal to one, whereas τ must lie between ±1, inclusive.  The surfaces of constant σ are oblate spheroids, as were those of constant μ, whereas the curves of constant τ are full hyperboloids of revolution, including the half-hyperboloids corresponding to ±ν.  Thus, these coordinates are degenerate; two points in Cartesian coordinates (x, y, ±z) map to one set of coordinates (σ, τ, φ).  This two-fold degeneracy in the sign of z is evident from the equations transforming from oblate spheroidal coordinates to the Cartesian coordinates

The coordinates  and  have a simple relation to the distances to the focal ring. For any point, the sum  of its distances to the focal ring equals , whereas their difference  equals .

Coordinate surfaces

Similar to its counterpart μ, the surfaces of constant σ form oblate spheroids

Similarly, the surfaces of constant τ form full one-sheet hyperboloids of revolution

Scale factors

The scale factors for the alternative oblate spheroidal coordinates  are

Hence, the infinitesimal volume element can be written

and the Laplacian equals

As is the case with spherical coordinates, Laplaces equation may be solved by the method of separation of variables to yield solutions in the form of oblate spheroidal harmonics, which are convenient to use when boundary conditions are defined on a surface with a constant oblate spheroidal coordinate (See Smythe, 1968).

See also
Ellipsoidal coordinates (geodesy)

References

Bibliography

No angles convention
  Uses ξ1 = a sinh μ,  ξ2 = sin ν, and ξ3 = cos φ.
  Same as Morse & Feshbach (1953), substituting uk for ξk.

  Uses hybrid coordinates ξ = sinh μ,  η = sin ν, and φ.

Angle convention
  Korn and Korn use the (μ, ν, φ) coordinates, but also introduce the degenerate (σ, τ, φ) coordinates.
  Like Korn and Korn (1961), but uses colatitude θ = 90° - ν instead of latitude ν.
  Moon and Spencer use the colatitude convention θ = 90° - ν, and rename φ as ψ.

Unusual convention
  Treats the oblate spheroidal coordinates as a limiting case of the general ellipsoidal coordinates.  Uses (ξ, η, ζ) coordinates that have the units of distance squared.

External links
MathWorld description of oblate spheroidal coordinates

Three-dimensional coordinate systems
Orthogonal coordinate systems